Walton County is a county located in the north central portion of the U.S. state of Georgia. As of the 2020 census, the population was 96,673. It is located about 30 miles east of the state capital, the city of Atlanta. Monroe is the county seat; Loganville is another major city.

Walton County is part of the Atlanta-Sandy Springs-Roswell, GA Metropolitan Statistical Area.

History

Walton County was created on December 15, 1818.  It is named for George Walton, one of the three men from Georgia who signed the United States Declaration of Independence.  The other two were Button Gwinnett and Lyman Hall.

A Supreme Court ruling in April 1946 had ruled that white primaries were unconstitutional, enabling some black citizens in Georgia to cast ballots for the first time during the primary race later that summer. This increased social tensions in many areas, as whites continued to oppose voting by blacks. In addition, many whites resisted black veterans' efforts to gain expanded freedoms following their service during World War II.

Moore's Ford lynchings (1946)

In July 1946, the county was the site of one of the last mass lynchings of the pre-Civil Rights Era, when four African Americans, two young married couples, were murdered here. African American Roger Malcom had had an argument with a local white farmer, "ostensibly over a woman". He and his pregnant wife, and her cousin and her husband, were beaten and lynched on July 25.

A historical highway marker erected by the state in the 21st century reads:
2.4 miles east, at Moore’s Ford Bridge on the Apalachee River, four African-Americans - George and Mae Murray Dorsey and Roger and Dorothy Dorsey Malcom (reportedly 7 months pregnant) - were brutally beaten and shot by an unmasked mob on the afternoon of July 25, 1946. The lynching followed an argument between Roger Malcom and a local white farmer. These unsolved murders played a crucial role in both President Truman’s commitment to civil rights legislation and the ensuing modern civil rights movement.

The sign is at 33° 51.417′ N, 83° 36.733′ W. Marker is near Monroe, Georgia, in Walton County. This is at the intersection of U.S. 78 and Locklin Road, on the right when traveling east on U.S. 78.

In 1998, local people arranged a biracial memorial service honoring the victims, which was held at Moore's Ford Bridge.
Since then a local interracial committee organized to rekindle attention to the case, in hopes of bringing justice to the victims. They also gained state support to erect the historical highway marker noted above to mark the unsolved murders and commemorate the victims.

In the 21st century, commemoration has included an on-site reenactment, held annually since 2005 as part of the education effort.

Fire in a Canebrake: The Last Mass Lynching in America (2003), by author Laura Wexler, is among the books to explore the case and social context, and related evidence, including reference to contemporary FBI reports in the investigation ordered under President Truman.

In the early 21st century, the US Department of Justice reopened an investigation into the cold case, but they were unable to gain sufficient evidence to prosecute any survivors among the more than 50 suspects that FBI files from 1946 had suggested had been involved in the lynching. A local multi-ethnic committee continues to press for the case to be reviewed again in hopes of bringing justice to the victims. In February 2014 they presented a video to the Walton Board of Commissioners about the case.

Geography
The county is located in the Piedmont region of the state.

The western half of Walton County, in a half circle from Social Circle through Monroe to northeast of Loganville, is located in the Upper Ocmulgee River sub-basin of the Altamaha River basin.  The eastern part of the county, east of that curve, is located in the Upper Oconee River sub-basin of the same Altamaha River basin.

Adjacent counties
 Barrow County – north
 Oconee County – northeast
 Morgan County – southeast
 Newton County – south
 Rockdale County – southwest
 Gwinnett County – northwest

Transportation

Major highways

  Interstate 20
  U.S. Route 78
  U.S. Route 278
  State Route 10
  State Route 10 Business
  State Route 11
  State Route 12
  State Route 20
  State Route 81
  State Route 83
  State Route 138
  State Route 186
  State Route 402 (unsigned designation for I-20)

Walton County doesn't have any pedestrian trails. However, there are trails in neighboring Gwinnett and Rockdale county such as the Arabia Mountain Path, Conyers Trail and Cedar Creek Trail Loop.

Demographics
There was a noted decline in population from 1900 to 1960, as thousands of African Americans left the rural area in the Great Migration, moving to the North, Midwest and West Coast to escape social oppression and to gain better jobs and opportunities.

With dramatic new growth related to the rise of Atlanta as a corporate city, the demographics have changed and the county is majority white in the 21st century. The area has been developed for suburban housing and retail.

2000 census
As of the census of 2000, there were 60,687 people, 21,307 households, and 17,002 families living in the county. There were 22,500 housing units at an average density of 68 per square mile (26/km2). The racial makeup of the county was 83.03% White, 14.42% Black or African American, 0.25% Native American, 0.70% Asian, 0.02% Pacific Islander, 0.64% from other races, and 0.95% from two or more races. 1.92% of the population were Hispanic or Latino of any race.

There were 21,307 households, out of which 39.20% had children under the age of 18 living with them, 62.70% were married couples living together, 12.80% had a female householder with no husband present, and 20.20% were non-families. 16.60% of all households were made up of individuals, and 6.20% had someone living alone who was 65 years of age or older. The average household size was 2.82 and the average family size was 3.16.

In the county, the population was spread out, with 28.40% under the age of 18, 8.10% from 18 to 24, 32.20% from 25 to 44, 21.70% from 45 to 64, and 9.60% who were 65 years of age or older. The median age was 34 years. For every 100 females, there were 94.90 males. For every 100 females age 18 and over, there were 93.00 males.

The median income for a household in the county was $46,479 and the median income for a family was $52,386. Males had a median income of $37,482 versus $25,840 for females. The per capita income for the county was $19,470. About 8.00% of families and 9.70% of the population were below the poverty line, including 12.30% of those under age 18 and 10.60% of those age 65 or over.

2010 census
As of the 2010 United States Census, there were 83,768 people, 29,583 households, and 22,921 families living in the county. The racial makeup of the county was 80.1% white, 15.6% black or African American, 1.1% Asian, 0.3% American Indian, 0.1% Pacific islander, 1.4% from other races, and 1.5% from two or more races. Those of Hispanic or Latino origin made up 3.2% of the population. In terms of ancestry, 20.2% identified as American, 15.6% as African-American, 12.2% as Irish, 10.9% as English, and 8.9% as German.

Of the 29,583 households, 40.7% had children under the age of 18 living with them, 58.5% were married couples living together, 13.9% had a female householder with no husband present, 22.5% were non-families, and 18.7% of all households were made up of individuals. The average household size was 2.81 and the average family size was 3.19. The median age was 37.4 years.

The median income for a household in the county was $51,721 and the median income for a family was $58,750. Males had a median income of $45,669 versus $32,064 for females. The per capita income for the county was $22,521. About 10.5% of families and 12.5% of the population were below the poverty line, including 17.6% of those under age 18 and 9.1% of those age 65 or over.

2020 census

As of the 2020 United States census, there were 96,673 people, 33,350 households, and 25,736 families residing in the county.

Government
Walton County has a six-member commission elected from single-member districts. This legislative body can pass laws for the county and tax bills. The county chairman is elected at-large to serve as the leader. If a seat becomes vacant during the term, the governor can appoint someone to fill the seat, based on recommendations. In 2015, two of the six positions were filled by appointees.

Politics

Communities

Cities
 Loganville
 Monroe
 Social Circle
 Jersey
 Good Hope
 Walnut Grove

Towns
 Between

Unincorporated communities
 Bold Springs
 Campton
 Gratis
 Mt. Vernon
 Pannell
 Windsor
 Youth
 Split Silk

See also

 National Register of Historic Places listings in Walton County, Georgia
 Hard Labor Creek Regional Reservoir
List of counties in Georgia

References
 Camp, Lynn Robinson, and Jennifer E. Cheek-Collins. Walton County, Georgia (Black America Series; Charleston, S.C., 2003).
 Sams, Anita B.  Wayfarers in Walton: A History of Walton County, Georgia, 1818–1967 (Monroe, Ga., 1967).

External links
 Georgia.gov on Walton County
 https://web.archive.org/web/20070704131617/http://www.negrdc.org/counties/walton/default.asp
  "Holding on to Those Who Can't be Held": Reenacting a Lynching at Moore's Ford, Georgia" Southern Spaces, November 8, 2010.

 
Georgia (U.S. state) counties
1818 establishments in Georgia (U.S. state)
Populated places established in 1818
Walton